The 2000 Chilean telethon was the 16th Teletón solidarity campaign held in Chile, taking place on 1–2 December 2000. The theme for 2000 was "A Challenge to all Chileans." The goal was met and exceeded with a final collection of CL$6,772,445,028. The poster boy for the event was Ignacio Soto.

This version was performed 2 years after the previous because in December 1999, because the presidential elections took place. This was the first telethon to be held during the government of Eduardo Frei Ruiz-Tagle. , making 2000 the first year the telethon was held under the leadership of Ricardo Lagos Escobar.

Performances 

At 10:00 PM on Friday December 1, the 2000 Telethon kicked off with a musical number performed by entertainer Antonio Vodanovic alongside all of the poster boys and girls from the previous crusades from 1978 to 1998 on the façade of the Teatro Teletón, where each performer (Álvaro Véliz, José Alfredo Fuentes, Cecilia Echenique, Rachel and Mala Junta) sang the end of their year's song. Don Francisco gave his traditional speech of encouragement and the best moments of past telethons were projected on a giant screen.

Among others, Pedro Fernández, Lucero, and Myriam Hernández performed. The emotional highpoint of the telethon came when Millaray Viera, the daughter of the deceased Uruguayan singer Gervasio, performed a tribute both to her father and to all those who had died and supported the charity event during the 22 years it had been running.

At midnight, a group of sports professionals led by Eliseo Salazar and including such sports luminaries as  Mario Mauriziano, Gert Weil, Carlos Caszely, Rocío Ravest, and Fernando González performed an original musical number. The second section began with a set of cumbias broadcast from the Teatro Monumental and performed by Daniel Fuensalida, Miguel Piñera, Luis 'Chichón' Hernández, and Gloria Aros. Other participants included Tropical Sound, Antonio Ríos, Alegría, and Organización X.

In the early hours of the morning the comedians took the stage with celebrity performances by Checho Hirane and Cristián García-Huidobro. Memo Bunke, Millennium Show, Dinamita Show, Melón and Melame, Dino Gordillo and Daniel Alcaíno as Peter Veneno also performed. Then, the much anticipated "Vedetón arrived, presented by Leo Caprile and with the participation of Marcos 'Charola' Pizarro, where the cabaret stars Beatriz Alegret, Tatiana Merino, Marcia Saenz and Anoika Wade arrived dressed as prisoners. Those responsible for freeing them were members of the popular and controversial theatre group 'Los Sin Vergüenzas'.

At dawn the female section began with Kike Morandé and the new comedy persona Charly Badulaque, a character of Claudio Reyes. Some of the other participants were Nicolás Massú, Jorge Zabaleta, Pedro Lladser and Fernando González, who finished as the section winner.

In the morning there was a large drop-off in donations which was followed by an electrical failure that affected the whole theatre. Mario Kreutzberger asked Chilectra about the possibility of a generator. Following this was a segment of La Nueva Ola with the presenter from Radio Pudahuel, Pablo Aguilera. The children's section was then broadcast from the Central Court of the Chile National Stadium.

In the afternoon Disfruta, Lider, and Santa Isabel performed. The reduction of donations was becoming worrying, leading to an improvised appearance of the Venezuelan artist José Luis Rodríguez, 'El Puma', who made a passionate speech to the Chileans to get up and take part, along with singing "El Pavo Real". Donations increased greatly after his performance.

Before going to the newscasts from the separate television channels, Lider announced that they had collected $250,387,198 in total. Following the broadcasts, the latest total of $3,524,679,023 was read out in the theatre.

At 10 p.m. on Saturday, 2 December the final section began in the Chile National Stadium with the winner of "Nace una Estrella" (A Star is Born) singing the Ode To Joy. Artists such as Alberto Plaza, Lucero, Pedro Fernández, Fulanito, Gondwana, Douglas, Azul Azul, and Elvis Crespo were onstage.

The final total of $6,450,614,205 was given and Don Francisco thanked all those who had taken part in this solidarity campaign. The entertainers and artists boarded the Tren de la Felicidad (The Happiness Train) for an Olympic circuit, becoming a symbol of the campaign. In addition, over the scoreboard, written in fireworks was the phrase "Gracias Chile" (Thank you Chile), as had happened in 1995, 1996, and 1998.

Telethon lottery 
The Telethon company put on a contest for the campaign despite the few sponsors involved that year. It was called "El Numero Magico" (The Magic Number) and consisted of a lottery. To qualify for the draw, you had to show a  preference for products and services available on that Telethon. The prize was a total of $1,000,000 in products associated with the 16th solidarity campaign.

The winning number selected was announced in the news broadcasts (Teletrece (Canal 13), 24 Horas (TVN), Meganoticias (Megavisión), Chilevisión Noticias (Chilevisión), Telediario (Red Televisión), and Página Uno (UCV TV)).

Related events 
Distinguishing itself from previous years, Telethon 2000 also created several events to help large companies collect significant donations.

 Lomitón: Continuously throughout the entire course of the program, all Lomitón restaurants were open from Iquique to Puerto Montt, with the aim of selling 270,000 sandwiches in about 20 hours. This goal was achieved, allowing the restaurant chain to donate CL$84,599,000 to Telethon.
 Líder: From the start of the event at the Teatro Teleton, a huge sand hourglass was run through five times (for the five letters of the word LIDER that lit up, one by one, every time the last grain of sand fell). Upon the opening of all Líder's mega-markets on December 2, the campaign would levy 100% of the purchases of all products that were on Telethon. When the last letter lit up the cost of all of the purchases in the next hour and a half throughout Chile was donated by Líder, totaling CL$250,387,198.
 Disfruta: During the afternoon at the Central Tennis Court of the National Stadium, Disfruta challenged 2,000 people to arrive wearing the Chilean colours (white, blue, and red) and a guitar.  Totaling 5,000, the crowd sang first a well known song "Si vas para Chile" (If you're for Chile) and then a popular advertising jingle about the Disfruta effervescent salts of that time. In return, Disfruta donated CL$120 million for an advanced assisted walking system for disabled children.
 Santa Isabel ("Besotón" (Big Kiss)): Also that day, but in the Playa El Sol de Viña del Mar, 1,000 couples (men and women), each carrying a bag from Santa Isabel supermarkets, simultaneously kissed for one minute. As a result, the supermarket company gave Telethon a donation of CL$25 million.

Donation totals

Sponsors

Artists

National singers 
  Alberto Plaza
  Mala Junta
  Douglas
  Cecilia Echeñique
  Millaray Viera
  Gondwana
  Álvaro Véliz
  La Sonora de Tommy Rey
  Lucybell
  Chancho en Piedra
  La Sociedad
  
   Joe Vasconcellos
  Tropical Sound
  René de la Vega
  Alegría

International singers 
  Lucero
  Pedro Fernández
  Antonio Ríos
  Luis Fonsi
  Sólo para Mujeres
  María Jean Marie
  Nancy Guerrero
  Edo Antonio
  Lynda Thomas
  La Mosca Tsé-Tsé
  Cuentos de la Cripta
  Azul Azul
  Elvis Crespo
  José Luis Rodríguez "El Puma"
  Organización X
   Fulanito

Comedians 
 Álvaro Salas
 Peter Veneno
 Dinamita Show
 Los Indolatinos
 Memo Bunke
 Millennium Show
 Dino Gordillo
 Melón y Melame
 Charly Badulaque
 Coco Rallado
 Luciano Bello

Children's section 
 Profesor Rossa
 Cachureos
 Zoolo TV

Adult's section 
 Tatiana Merino
 Marcia Sáenz
 Beatriz Alegret
 Anoika Wade

Trivia 
 Plans were made to hold a Telethon in 1999, taking place on November 26 and November 27 of that year, but ended before completion. This was due to the proximity to the presidential election and on the severe economic crisis in Chile.

References

External links 
 

Telethon
Chilean telethons